The Bunyip is a weekly newspaper, first printed on 5 September 1863, and originally published and printed in Gawler, South Australia. Its distribution area includes the Gawler, Barossa, Light, Playford, and Adelaide Plains areas. Along with The Murray Pioneer, The River News, and The Loxton News, The Bunyip was now owned (since 2003) by the Taylor Group of Newspapers and printed in Renmark.

On 1 April 2020, The Bunyip announced that it would cease publication "indefinitely" as a result of losses due to the coronavirus crisis. However, due to public support, the newspaper was able to return shortly afterwards. In August–October 2020, with the temporary closure of The Border Watch, The Bunyip briefly became South Australia's oldest rural newspaper still in print.

History
Originally a monthly publication, the first issue of The Bunyip, subtitled "Gawler Humbug Society's Chronicle" was issued on 5 September 1863, consisted of eight pages and was priced at 6d. The name was chosen because "the Bunyip is the true type of Australian Humbug!" It was warmly greeted by the South Australian Register, observing that it was "full of racy articles and local hits ... a very humorous article on the Gawler Agricultural Society's last dinner, which (was) not only very amusing but strictly correct ... (and should) undoubtedly prove a great success."

With the paper's success, publication increased to bi-monthly in February 1865 (there was none printed in January), appearing on the first and third Saturday of each month. With new printing machinery, the paper upsized to broadsheet format, and its title had become The Bunyip or Gawler Chronicle and Northern Advertiser. The following year it became a weekly. By this time however, the paper's original offbeat stance had quite vanished and it had become a regular newspaper.

With three newspapers published in Gawler at the time, conditions allowed William Barnet, the proprietor, to purchase rival the Gawler Times (5 March 1869 to 27 June 1873). Another rival, the weekly (later biweekly) Gawler Mercury (27 November 1875 – 8 July 1876) also folded after a brief run of less than nine months. In February 1885 The Bunyips building was destroyed by fire. Barnet again wasted no time in having its competitor of seven years, the Gawler Standard''' (11 January 1878 – 27 February 1885), take over printing duties, then arranged with J. N. Richards (died 23 August 1886), its proprietor, for an immediate merger.

In January 1969, the newspaper absorbed the Junction and Gilbert Valley News, which had been published in Hamley Bridge since February 1940.

ControversiesThe Bunyip's first issue elicited a libel case against the publisher, William Barnet, by one Dr. Home Popham who had set up a hospital in the town and who had advertised boastfully in The Northern Star. The court proceedings were a merry affair with Mr. Stow appearing for the defence and the jury found for the plaintiff, awarding damages of one shilling. Four years later, Barnet was sued in the SA. Supreme Court by Henry Edward Bright MP, for libel and found not guilty. This was greeted by both The Register and the Advertiser as a landmark decision.

List of owners
William Barnet (1834–1895) married Hannah Burfield. His daughter Edith Violet Barnet married Frederic C. Custance, son of Professor John D. Custance in 1916.
Robert Henry Barnet (c. 1869–1917) was third son of William and Hannah
Frank L(indley) Barnet (1876–1941), a graduate of Roseworthy College, was owner from 1917. He was fifth son of William and Hannah, married Clarice Isobel Carne in 1919.
Kenneth Lindley "Ken" Barnet (1919–2000) was son of Frank and Clarice.
John Barnet ran the paper from 1975.
It remained in the Barnet family until 2003. It is now owned by the Taylor Group, also a family concern, who are also owners of the Murray Pioneer, based in Renmark.

List of editors

Dr. George Nott 1863 to 1866
T. Godfrey 1867 to 1868 (went on to Wallaroo Times then New Zealand) 
J. B. Austin 1868 (then founded Gawler Times'')
Benjamin Hoare 1869 to 1871 (later to have an illustrious career with the Melbourne Age)
Edward Grundy 1871 to 1875 (ex-parliamentarian and political aspirant 1875)
George E. Loyau 1878 to 1879 (an important historian of the district)
Louis Joseph Wilson 1880 (arrested for embezzling £107 10s. 6d. from Mudla Wirra council, of which he was clerk. Was also secretary of the Jockey Club)
Alfred Drakard 1881 to 1882
Henry John "Harry" Congreve 1885 to 1890 (also prominent writer to Adelaide papers as "H. J. C.")
E. H. Coombe 1890 to 1914
Robert Barnet 1914 to 1917
Leslie S. Duncan 1917 to c. 1945 Duncan was M.P. for Gawler, and with the Bunyip for 30 years.
Ken Barnet c. 1945 to c. 1965
Paul Vincent c. 1965 to ??
Ken Barnet
John Barnet 1975 to 2003
Terry Williams 2003 to 2004
Heidi Helbig 2004 
Rob McLean 2011
Grady Hudd 2016
Nick Hopton 2021 to 2022
Vanessa Rose 2022
Brendan Simpkins 2022

Distribution
Like other Taylor Group publications, the newspaper is also available online.

See also
 Bunyip

Notes

References

External links
 Company website
 "The Bunyip": Gawler Public Library Historical Pamphlet No. 5

Newspapers published in South Australia
Publications established in 1863
Gawler, South Australia
Newspapers on Trove
Weekly newspapers published in Australia